Daniel da Silva may refer to:

Dan DaSilva, Canadian ice hockey player
Daniel da Silva (mathematician) (1814–1878), Portuguese mathematician
Daniel Dutra da Silva (born 1988), Brazilian tennis player 
Daniel da Silva (footballer, born 1973), Brazilian international footballer
Daniel Da Silva (soccer, born 1998), Canadian soccer player
Daniel da Silva Carvalho (born 1983), Brazilian international footballer known as Daniel Carvalho
Daniel da Silva Soares (born 1982), Portuguese footballer known as Dani
Daniel Alves da Silva (born 1983), Brazilian international footballer known as Dani Alves
Daniel Marques da Silva (born 1983), Brazilian footballer known as Daniel Marques

See also
Daniel De Silva, Australian footballer
Daniel Silva (disambiguation)
Danilo da Silva (disambiguation)